The 2015 AIHL season was the 16th season of the Australian Ice Hockey League (AIHL). It ran from 25 April 2015, until 23 August 2015, with the Goodall Cup finals following on 29 and 30 August. The Newcastle North Stars won both the H Newman Reid Trophy for finishing first in the regular season, and the Goodall Cup after defeating the Melbourne Ice in the final.

Teams
In 2015 the AIHL had 8 teams competing in the league.

League business
The Gold Coast Blue Tongues licence expired two years after they were suspended from the AIHL due to their inability to organise a new ice rink. In response, the league has started making enquiries in Brisbane to gauge interest in placing a team back in the city. The Central Coast Rhinos who played in the AIHL between 2005 and 2008 applied to re-enter the league at the 2014 Annual General Meeting. Their application however was rejected for undisclosed reasons. The Sydney Bears announced that they were moving from the Sydney Ice Arena to the Penrith Ice Palace. The Bears previously played at the Ice Palace from 2007 to 2011 before relocating to the Ice Arena. The team's move comes after the Ice Arena's land was approved for redevelopment. In January 2015, the Sydney Ice Dogs announced a deal with DGB Media Group to produce a highlights program for their home games which will be aired on the Television Sydney station. On 4 February, the Canberra Institute of Technology announced that they had signed on with the CBR Brave as a major sponsor with a deal that would include the Institutes logo on the team jerseys and their students working with the players as part of their training. The Brave also signed Anytime Fitness as a sleeve sponsor, Benchmarc Financial Group as a pants sponsor and Smoque restaurant as the club's official post match partner. In April 2015, the Sydney Ice Dogs signed Southern Cross Group Services as a new sponsor for the club. In March the league revealed new branding which included a new logo and slogan “Fast, Fierce, Full-on”. The new logo which is designed to represent the Australian Commonwealth star and a blade of an ice hockey stick was developed by Coordinate. The CBR Brave announced that they had established a junior affiliate club, known as the Junior Brave, in conjunction with Ice Hockey ACT to compete in the NSW Midget Ice Hockey League. On 17 March Hards Transport signed a deal with the Adelaide Adrenaline to become the club's naming rights sponsor. In April the Sydney Bears signed a deal with TGI Fridays Macquarie Centre restaurant to sponsor the bar located at the Penrith Ice Palace. They also announced a partnership with apparel company Ryzer for 2015 with the company supplying the home and away uniforms. The league changed one rule for the 2015 season, adopting the hybrid icing rule to allow players to better prepare for International Ice Hockey Federation competitions and mitigate risks associated with end wall collisions.

In May, watchmakers Haigh & Hastings signed a deal with the AIHL to become a sponsor for the 2015 season, expanding their activity in the league with the company already a major sponsor of the Perth Thunder. Also in May the Perth Thunder announced Ryan Laurel Resourcing, Sandalford Wines and Smartclub as a new sponsors of the club and the CBR Brave changed their official post match partner from Smoque restaurant to the Hellenic Club's Trattoria restaurant in order to accommodate the number of fans. In June, Sydney Ice Dogs head coach Anders Jespersen due to unknown reasons and was replaced by Sydney Bears player Mario Passarelli. The head coach position was then handed to Tim Flynn after Passarelli opted to play for the Ice Dogs as a skater. In July, the league signed a deal with TGI Fridays Australia which saw them named as the official restaurant of the AIHL. The deal includes TGI Fridays showing the Fox AIHL Games of the Week and the Melbourne Central restaurant hosting the official after part of the 2015 playoffs. Also in July the Perth Thunder announced that Zarraffa's Coffee and Nova 93.7 had signed on with the club as sponsors.

Exhibition games
The first exhibition game was held on 21 March between the Adelaide Adrenaline and an Ice Hockey South Australia A-Grade All Stars team at the Adelaide Ice Arena. The Adrenaline defeated the All Stars 5–1. In April 2015 the Perth Thunder competed in a three-game exhibition series against the New Zealand national team at the Perth Ice Arena. The three games were held as part of the New Zealand team's preparation for the 2015 IIHF World Championship Division II Group B tournament. The Thunder won the series two games to one, winning the opening two games before being beaten in the third. The Wilson Cup tournament was held for the second year in a row and again featured all three New South Wales based clubs. The number of games was increased from four to seven with a double round-robin being held before a final between the two top ranked teams. The Sydney Bears finished first in the round robin, winning three of their four games, and were drawn against the Newcastle North Stars in the final. The North Stars won the final 4–3, claiming their first Wilson Cup title. On 18 April the Melbourne Ice and Melbourne Mustangs competed in a preseason game at the Medibank Icehouse with the Mustangs winning the game 9–1.

Personnel changes
In September 2014, the Sydney Ice Dogs announced that Andrew Petrie had resigned as head coach. A week later the Newcastle North Stars announced that they had signed Petrie as head coach for the 2015 season. Petrie replaced Garry Doré who stepped down from the position to focus on his role as general manager. In December 2014, the Melbourne Ice announced their new committee for 2015. Bernie O'Brien was elected president, replacing Emma Poynton, former Ice goaltender Stuart Denman was elected vice president, Erin Tempest elected secretary and Virginia Fitzwater was elected treasurer. Chris Caveny, Nigel Sherwin, Shan Humphries and Alexandra McKnight were also added to the committee, while Candace Smith and Jo Luciania stepped down from their positions. The Melbourne Mustangs announced that assistant coach Mark Connolly had stepped down from his position. He was replaced by current head coach of the Melbourne Whalers and Saints-Monarchs Premier A team, Michael Flaherty. In January 2015, the Adelaide Adrenaline announced that general manager Ross Noga had resigned from his position due to time constraints following a change in career. Also in January the CBR Brave announced that they had signed former player Brad Hunt as head coach, replacing Matti Luoma who relocated to Perth, Western Australia. In March 2015, both the Sydney Ice Dogs and the Perth Thunder announced the appointment of new head coaches. The Sydney Ice Dogs signed Oman national team head coach Anders Jespersen to replace Andrew Petrie who resigned in September 2014 to join the North Stars. The Thunder promoted assistant coach Dave Kenway to the head coach position, replacing Stan Scott who returns to his general manager position. Also in March, it was revealed that the Sydney Bears had hired former Sydney Ice Dogs head coach Ron Kuprowsky as an assistant to head coach Vladimir Rubes. In July, the CBR Brave announced that Brad Hunt had been replaced as head coach by goaltender Josh Unice on an interim basis. The club also announced that defenceman Aaron Clayworth would join the coaching panel as an assistant.

Player transfers

Interclub transfers

Retirements

New signings

Players lost

Regular season
The regular season started on 25 April 2015 and ran through to 23 August 2015 before the top four teams compete in the Goodall Cup playoff series. In February 2015 it was announced that the Sydney Bears and Sydney Ice Dogs had moved some of their home games to Canberra. The Sydney Bears home game against the CBR Brave on 20 June had to be moved due to the Penrith Ice Palace being unavailable for the game. The Sydney Ice Dogs moved both their 1 and 22 August home games against the Brave to Canberra for undisclosed reasons. The Ice Dogs also moved their 23 May home game in Liverpool against the Newcastle North Stars to 14 June at the Hunter Ice Skating Stadium in Newcastle. On 23 May the Brave hosted the Adelaide Adrenaline in the inaugural beyondblue cup at the Phillip Ice Skating Centre. The regular season game was held to rais awareness for the beyondblue charity and was won by the Brave 8–2. On 20 June the Perth Thunder's regular season match against the Melbourne Mustangs was held at the Perth Arena as a pre-game event to the Canada v USA Ice Hockey Classic match. The Thunder defeated the Mustangs 4–3 in front of a crowd of 2,000. On 28 July 2015 the league fined the Sydney Ice Dogs $500 and three competition points for multiple breaches of the AIHL by-law 4. The by-law requires a team to travel with at least 15 players unless an exemption has been granted. The Ice Dogs first breached the by-law on 4 July and received a written warning and then again breached it on 25 and 26 July, attracting the monetary fine and loss of competition points. The Ice Dogs, who at the time of the fine only had two competition points, revert to zero points and can not gain any further points until they have accumulated the points they have forfeited.

The Newcastle North Stars won the H Newman Reid Trophy after finishing first in the regular season with 63 points. Following the playoffs the AIHL announced the winners of the 2015 awards. Newcastle North Stars Geordie Wudrick and Jan Safar won the Most Valuable Player and Defenceman of the Year respectively, Kamil Jarina of the Sydney Bears won the Goaltender of the Year, Perth Thunder's Kieran Webster was named Rookie of the Year and Dave Kenway Coach of the Year, and the Skater's Network Local Player of the Year was won by Wehebe Darge of the Adelaide Adrenaline.

April

May

June

July

August

Source

Standings

1The Ice Dogs were fined three competition points for multiple breaches by-law 4 which requires teams to travel with at least 15 players unless an exemption has been granted.

Source

Statistics

Scoring leaders
List shows the ten top skaters sorted by points, then goals.

Leading goaltenders
Only the top five goaltenders, based on save percentage with a minimum 40% of the team's ice time.

Season awards

Below lists the 2015 AIHL regular season award winners.

Source

Goodall Cup playoffs
The 2015 playoffs started on 29 August 2015, with the Goodall Cup final being held on 30 August. Following the end of the regular season the top four teams advanced to the playoff series. All three games were held at the Medibank Icehouse in Docklands, Victoria, the home of the Melbourne Ice and Melbourne Mustangs. The series was a single game elimination with the two winning semi-finalists advancing to the Goodall Cup final. The finals were again sponsored by Air Canada, their third year in a row. The Goodall Cup was won by the Newcastle Northstars who defeated the Melbourne Ice 3–2, from a penalty shot in first overtime. Geordie Wudrick of the Newcastle North Stars was named the finals Most Valuable Player. Following a fundraising campaign the three playoff games were streamed live for free by ATC Productions with the grand final being watched in 771 cities across 89 countries. In addition Fox Sports broadcast a 90-minute special of each game on successive days from 8 to 10 September.

Semi-finals
All times are UTC+10:00

Final

All-Star weekend

On 19 August the league announced that they will hold the inaugural All-Star Weekend at the Hunter Ice Skating Stadium in Newcastle on 12 and 13 September. The event featured a skills competition on 12 September and an All-Star game on 13 September. APA Group was announced as the sponsor of the weekend while Fox Sports broadcast a 90-minute special on 17 September. The skills competition involved all 34 players competing in at least one of the six skill-based contests. The six events to be featured included a breakaway challenge, fastest skater, elimination shootout, hardest shot, shooting accuracy and puck control. The All-Star game consisted of two teams named Team Bales and Team Schlamp, named after their respective captains Brian Bales and Michael Schlamp and features players from different teams.

The Skills competition saw players from the Melbourne Ice and Newcastle North Stars take out two of the six events each, while the Adelaide Adrenaline and Perth Thunder picked up one each. On 13 September Team Schlamp defeated Team Bales 7–3 at the Hunter Ice Skating Stadium to win the 2015 All-Star Game. Patrick O’Kane of the Melbourne Mustangs was named the most valuable player of the match.

Skills competition
Breakaway Challenge: Brian Bales (Newcastle North Stars)
Fastest Skater: Robert Haselhurst (Perth Thunder)
Elimination Shootout: Matt Wetini (Newcastle North Stars)
Hardest Shot: Matt Armstrong – 96 mph (Melbourne Ice)
Shooting Accuracy: Josef Rezek (Adelaide Adrenaline)
Stick Handling: Thomas Powell (Melbourne Ice)

All-star game

References

External links
The Australian Ice Hockey League

2015 in ice hockey
2015 in Australian sport
2015